Joseph Edward Raycroft (November 15, 1867 – September 30, 1955) was the head men's basketball coach for the University of Chicago between 1906–07 and 1909–10. In his four seasons as coach, the Chicago Maroons compiled an overall record of 66 wins and 7 losses. His teams won four Big Ten Conference championships (then known as the Western Conference), and the 1907, 1908, and 1909 teams were all retroactively named national champions by the Helms Athletic Foundation; his 1909 team was also retroactively named the national champion by the Premo-Porretta Power Poll. His 90.4% career winning percentage is the highest all-time at Chicago. Prior to his time at Chicago, Raycroft also served as Lawrence University's head football coach for the 1894 season and compiled a 3–2 record. Raycroft also served as head football coach at Stevens Point Normal School—now known as the University of Wisconsin–Stevens Point—for two seasons, from 1895 to 1896.

Raycroft later served as Princeton University's Chairman of the Department of Health and Physical Education from 1911 until his retirement in 1936. Under his watch Raycroft developed a comprehensive student health program based in large measure upon intramural athletics, with participation rates approaching 90 percent of Princeton's undergraduate class.

Head coaching record

Football

Basketball

References

External links
 Full biography on Raycroft @ Princeton University Library Finding Aids
 

1867 births
1955 deaths
American football quarterbacks
American men's basketball players
Basketball coaches from Vermont
Basketball players from Vermont
Chicago Maroons football players
Chicago Maroons men's basketball coaches
Chicago Maroons men's basketball players
Lawrence Vikings football coaches
People from Williamstown, Vermont
Princeton University faculty
Rush Medical College alumni
Worcester Academy alumni
Wisconsin–Stevens Point Pointers football coaches
Basketball players from Trenton, New Jersey